Winston Wright (19431993) was a Jamaican keyboardist. He was a member of Tommy McCook's Supersonics, and acknowledged as Jamaica's master of the Hammond organ. Winston was born in May Pen, Jamaica on September 5, 1943 and died in Kingston, Jamaica on March 18,1993.  He attended Glenmuir High School where he learned the organ on an old Clavonette Organ.  While he was in school, he played with a local group called the Mercury Band based at the Capri Theatre in May Pen, much to his father's ire.  Tommy McCook saw Winston play at this time and he was invited to join the Supersonics, the Treasure Isle house band.

Perhaps Wright's best known work is as the uncredited lead organist on Harry J Allstars' 1969 instrumental hit "The Liquidator". Along with Jackie Jackson, Hux Brown, Gladstone "Gladdy" Anderson, Dougie Bryan, Winston Grennan and Paul Douglas, Winston was a member of a group of top session musicians known as the Dynamites, the Crystalites, the Beverley's All-Stars (or other All-Stars depending, on the producer) that played on countless recording sessions from the late '60s and early '70s.

Wright produced a solo single: "Top Secret", with the B-side "Crazy Rhythm" in 1970.

Having played for Toots and the Maytals from 1968 along with the Dynamites, Winston accompanied Toots with the Dynamites on their numerous tours throughout the 1970s and '80s.

He died of a heart attack in March 18,1993.

Discography

Singles:
Funny Girl
Young Folks
Flight 404
Double Up
Five Miles High
Moon Invader
Power Pack
Moonlight Groover
Mash It Up
Night Owl
Killowatt
Common People Reggae
Musical Shot
Mesh Wire
Groove Me V.2
Version Flight (Champion)
The Sleeper
It's Been A Long Time (Feel It Version)
Hold On Tight Version 2
Proud Feeling
Necktie
Earthquake
Ishan Version
In The Mood
Redemption Ground
Soul Pressure
Crazy Rhythm
Top Secret
Stealing Stealing V.2
Hide & Seek
Strolling Thru (Strolling In Hyde Park)
For Our Desire V.2 (Soul Movement)
That Did It
Silhouette
Doctor Upsetter
Champagne & Wine
Roll On Version 2
Revenge (Version 2)
My Love & I (Version 3)
Strange Affair
Want Money
Example	71
What Do You So (inst)
Example
Heads Or Tails
Cotton Comes To Harlem
Sinful Night
Reuben
Love Is The Thing
Love Of The Common People
You're All I Need
Sporty
Peace & Love
Rebeloution
Woman Don't You Go Astray
Larry's Mood
Salt & Pepper
Melancholy Rock (Lucifer)
Besekik Up (Feel Good)
Skanking Nanny
Soulful Disco
Sweet Mouth

With Herbie Mann
Reggae (Atlantic, 1973)
Surprises (Atlantic, 1973 [1976])
Reggae II (Atlantic, 1973 [1976])

References

1944 births
1993 deaths
People from Clarendon Parish, Jamaica
Jamaican musicians